is a Japanese voice actor, live-action actor, and narrator.

Career
Tachiki is known for his low voice. He serves as the narrator for Pride Fighting Championships and Dream. He and Toshiyuki Morikawa formed the band "2HEARTS" in 2003. Their song, "Ever Free", served as the ending theme for Dynasty Warriors 4: Empires. Tachiki and Ami Mimatsu formed a previous band, "Takada Band". One of their works is the opening theme for Blue Seed.

In 2022, Tachiki received the Best Supporting Actor Award at the 16th Seiyu Awards.

Filmography

Television animation
1990
Be-Bop High School (Nakama, Tooru)
1991
Anime Himitsu no Hanazono (Mr. Pitcher)
1994
 Brave Police J-Decker (Shadow Maru)
1995
Neon Genesis Evangelion (Gendo Ikari)
1996
Detective Conan (Vodka)
Those Who Hunt Elves (Judge)
1997
Pocket Monsters (Matis, Anoki)
1999
Eden's Bowy (Vilog)
Turn A Gundam (Muron Muron)
2000
Hajime no Ippo (Fujiwara Yoshio)
Inuyasha (Gamajiro, Tsukumo no Gama, Sō'unga)
Weekly Story Land (Yakuza, Delinquent D, Kurokawa, Cameraman)
2001
A Little Snow Fairy Sugar (Joe the crow)
Super GALS! Kotobuki Ran Ginzō Matsuo (Taizo Kotobuki) 
2002
Ghost in the Shell: Stand Alone Complex (A criminal, episode 16)
Pocket Monsters: Advanced Generation (Dr. Odamaki, Takeshi's Runpappa)
2003
Ashita no Nadja (Count Harcourt)
Fullmetal Alchemist (Middle-aged Detective in ep10)
2004
Basilisk (Hattori Hanzo 1st (Ogen & Danjo Youngs: Hattori Hanzo 4th "Masahiro" (Ogen & Danjo Oldest)
Gravion Zwei (President)
Monster (Reporter in Episode 22)
2005
Bleach (Kenpachi Zaraki)
Naruto (Gatsu, bounty hunter in episode 159-160)
2006
Aria the Natural (Apa-jiisan)
Gintama (Taizou Hasegawa/MADAO, Narrator)
Higurashi no Naku Koro ni (Tatsuyoshi Kasai)
Zegapain (Talbot)
2007
D.Gray-man (Narrator, Mana Walker)
El Cazador de la Bruja (Ricardo)
Kaiji (Narrator)
Hidamari Sketch (Kishi's father, janitor, others)
2008
Hidamari Sketch x365 (Narrator)
2009
Bakemonogatari (Hitagi Senjougahara's father)
Fullmetal Alchemist: Brotherhood (Homunculus Sloth)
Queen's Blade (Setra)
2010
Arakawa Under the Bridge (Billy)
2011
Level E (Narrator)
Nichijou (Peso, 10 Yen, and Wadōkaichin)
2012
Campione! (Narrator)
High School DxD (Ddraig)
2013
Hunter × Hunter (2011) (Menthuthuyoupi)
Tamako Market (Gohei Ōji)
2014
Barakamon (Ikkō Sakamoto)
Captain Earth (Bartender)
Nisekoi (Tachibana's dad)
2015
Blood Blockade Battlefront (Osmerald)
2016
Big Order (Benkei Narukami)
The Morose Mononokean (Gigigi no Oyabun)
Cardfight!! Vanguard G: Stride Gate (Rive Shindou)
Mob Psycho 100 (Terada)
2017
The Idolm@ster SideM (Takashi Saito)
Restaurant to Another World (Alphonse)
In Another World with My Smartphone (God)
Atelier Lydie & Suelle: The Alchemists and the Mysterious Paintings (Hagel Boldness)
2018
March Comes in Like a Lion (Kokubu)
Golden Kamuy (Narrator)
Gakuen Basara (Yoshitsugu Ōtani)
2021
Getter Robo Arc (McDonald)
Resident Evil: Infinite Darkness (Jason)
2022
Love After World Domination (Narrator)

Unknown date
Ghost Hound (Ryōya Komori)
Gungrave (Bunji Kugashira)
Hyakka Ryouran Samurai Girls (Narrator)
Jushin Enbu Hero Tales (Kouchou)
La storia della Arcana Famiglia (Mondo)
Letter Bee (Hazel Valentine)
Little Snow Fairy Sugar (The Elder)
Lucky Star (over 60 extra characters)
Mobile Suit Victory Gundam (Wattary Gilla)
Nana (Ginpei Shiroboshi)
Night Warriors: Darkstalkers' Revenge (Jon Talbain)
Nogizaka Haruka no Himitsu (Gentō Nogizaka)
One Piece (Don Krieg, Akainu)
Ore no Imoto ga Konna ni Kawaii Wake ga Nai, (Daisuke Kosaka)
Ouran High School Host Club (Yoshio Ootori)
Samurai Champloo (Riki)
Sengoku Basara: End of Judgement (Ōtani Yoshitsugu)
Shinreigari/Ghost Hound (Ryōya Komori)
SoltyRei (Joseph)
Space Brothers (Jason Butler)
Tales of Symphonia: The Animation (Kratos)
Trigun (Minor roles)
Trinity Blood (Václav Havel)
Weiss Kreuz (Botan)
Yakitate!! Japan (Kirisaki Yuuichi)
Zan Sayonara Zetsubō Sensei (General Frost, Episode 7)

Animated films
Patlabor 2: The Movie (1993) (Buchiyama)
Slam Dunk Movie 2: National Champions, Sakuragi Hanamichi! (1994) (Koichiro Nango)
Crayon Shin-chan: The Storm Called: The Battle of the Warring States (2002) (Naotaka Magara Tarozaemon)
The Girl Who Leapt Through Time (2006) (Fukushima-sensei)
Saint Young Men (2013) (Ryuuji)
Crayon Shin-chan: Intense Battle! Robo Dad Strikes Back (2014) (Akogidesu)
Cyborg 009 Vs. Devilman (2015) (Professor Adams)
Fireworks (2017)

Video games

Sonic Colors (2010) (Wisp Announcer)
Sonic Generations (2010) (Wisp Announcer)
Nier (2010) (Grimoire Noir)
Sonic Lost World (2013) (Wisp Announcer)
 Granblue Fantasy (2014) (Vaseraga)
 Sonic Boom: Rise of Lyric (2014) (Cliff)
Bloodborne (2015) (Father Gascoigne)
Zero Escape: Zero Time Dilemma - Zero
Counter-Strike Online 2 (2017) (Leet, Jean Pierre)
Team Sonic Racing (2019) (Wisp Announcer)
Sonic Colors: Ultimate (2021) (Wisp Announcer)

Unknown date
Angelique (Victor)
 Anubis: Zone of the Enders / Zone of the Enders: The 2nd Runner (Lt. Volkovo, Zakat Runners, Doctor)
Atelier Rorona: The Alchemist of Arland (Hagel Baldness)
Atelier Totori: The Adventurer of Arland (Hagel Baldness, Gerhard)
Atelier Meruru: The Apprentice of Arland (Hagel Baldness)
Bleach Wii (Zaraki Kenpachi)
Call of Duty: Modern Warfare 3 (Overlord, Japanese dub)
Crash Bandicoot series (Tiny Tiger, Japanese dub)
Dragon's Dogma (Asalam, Japanese dub)
Dragon Quest (Yangus)
Dragon Quest: Heroes (Yangus)
Drakengard 2 (Gismor)
Duke Nukem Forever (Duke Nukem, Japanese dub)
Fist of the North Star: Ken's Rage (Raoh)
Gungrave (Bunji Kugashira)
Gungrave Overdose (Bunji Kugashira)
Kamen Rider: Climax Heroes W (Gaia Memory)
Kessen III (Shibata Katsuie)
Kingdom Hearts 358/2 Days (Lexaeus)
Kingdom Hearts II (Lexaeus)
Magical Drop III (Emperor, Hermit)
Majou Ou (Edgar Lang)

Odin Sphere (Odin, Verdo, Wagner)
Perfect Dark Zero (Jack Dark, Japanese dub)
Persona 4 Arena (Announcer)
Phantasy Star Online 2 (Zig)
PlayStation All-Stars Battle Royale (Sweet Tooth, Japanese dub)
Sengoku Basara: Samurai Heroes (Otani Yoshitsugu)
School of Ragnarok (Balharades)
Splinter Cell: Blacklist (Majid Sadiq, Japanese dub)
Summon Night X: Tears Crown (Seitz Endorge)
Tales of Vesperia (Kratos Aurion)
The Last Story (General Trista)
Vampire Hunter D (Borgoff)

Drama CD
110 Ban wa Koi no Hajimari series 2: 110 Ban wa Amai Kodou (xxxx) (Saburou Aramaki)
Aka no Shinmon (xxxx) (Keigo Watanabe)
Lesson XX (xxxx) (Takoyakushi)
Miscast series (xxxx-xx) (Masashi Kogure)
Ouchou Haru no Yoi no Romance (xxxx) (Takuson)
Saint Seiya (xxxx) (Taurus Aldebaran)
Saredo Futeki na Yatsura (xxxx) (Nobuaki Kutani)

Tokusatsu
Chōriki Sentai Ohranger (1995) (Bara Printer)
Kamen Rider Kuuga (2000) (Narrator)
Kamen Rider Blade (2004) (King Rouzer)
Kamen Rider Decade (2009) (N-Gamio-Zeda)
Kamen Rider W (2009) (Narrator, Gaia Memory)
Kamen Rider × Kamen Rider OOO & W Featuring Skull: Movie War Core (2010) (Kamen Rider Core)
Kamen Rider: Beyond Generations (2021) (Shocker Executive)

Live-action drama
 Gintama 2 (2018) (Taizo "Madao" Hasegawa)

Music singles
 Momoiro Clover Z - "Z Densetsu: Owarinaki Kakumei" (xxxx) (Announcer)

Dubbing roles

Live-action
Forest Whitaker
Panic Room (Burnham)
The Last King of Scotland (Idi Amin)
Street Kings (Captain Jackie "Jack" Wander)
Criminal Minds (Sam Cooper)
Criminal Minds: Suspect Behavior (Sam Cooper)
The Butler (2016 BS Japan edition) (Cecil Gaines)
The Last Stand (Agent John Bannister)
Zulu (Ali Sokhela)
Taken 3 (Inspector Franck Dotzler)
Southpaw (Titus "Tick" Wills)
Rogue One (Saw Gerrera)
Arrival (Colonel Weber)
How It Ends (Tom)
Tom Sizemore
Enemy of the State (2003 Fuji TV edition) (Boss Paulie Pintero)
Bringing Out the Dead (Tom Wolls)
Pearl Harbor (Sergeant Earl Sistern)
Black Hawk Down (2004 TV Tokyo edition) (LTC Danny McKnight)
Big Trouble (Snake Dupree)
Shawn Roberts
Resident Evil: Afterlife (Albert Wesker)
Resident Evil: Retribution (Albert Wesker)
Resident Evil: The Final Chapter (Albert Wesker)
12 Years a Slave (Solomon Northup / Platt (Chiwetel Ejiofor))
Apollo 13 (2003 Fuji TV edition) (Fred Haise (Bill Paxton))
Armageddon (2002 Fuji TV edition) (Colonel Davis (Marshall Teague))
Armageddon (2004 NTV edition) (Chick (Will Patton))
Black Rain (Masahiro Matsumoto (Ken Takakura))
Bob Roberts (John Alijah "Bugs" Raplin (Giancarlo Esposito))
Born on the Fourth of July (VHS edition) (Marine Lieutenant (David Warshofsky))
Cliffhanger (1997 NTV edition) (Ryan (Gregory Scott Cummins))
The Dark Knight (2012 TV Asahi edition) (James Gordon (Gary Oldman))
Die Another Day (Damian Falco (Michael Madsen))
Dr. Quinn, Medicine Woman (Hank Lawson (William Shockley))
Dragon Blade (Rat (Wang Taili))
Dreamer (Everett Palmer (David Morse))
Drop Zone (Ty Moncrief (Gary Busey))
Duets (Reggie Kane (Andre Braugher))
Dune (Glossu Rabban (Dave Bautista))
End of Days (2001 TV Asahi edition) (Albino (Victor Varnado))
Exit Wounds (2004 NTV edition) (Sergeant Lewis Strutt (Michael Jai White))
Furious 7 (Jakande (Djimon Hounsou))
Gone in 60 Seconds (Donny Astricky (Chi McBride))
Guardians of the Galaxy (Yondu Udonta (Michael Rooker))
Guardians of the Galaxy Vol. 2 (Yondu Udonta (Michael Rooker))
Halo: Nightfall (Aiken (Steven Waddington))
Happy Gilmore (Shooter McGavin (Christopher McDonald))
Hatfields & McCoys (Randolph "Randall" McCoy (Bill Paxton))
Independence Day: Resurgence (General Joshua T. Adams (William Fichtner))
Iron Will (Ned Dodd (August Schellenberg))
Disney's The Kid (Kenny (Chi McBride))
Kill Bill (Budd (Michael Madsen))
Musa (Dae-Jung (Ahn Sung-ki))
Lord of the Rings trilogy (Gamling (Bruce Hopkins))
Pulp Fiction (Jimmie (Quentin Tarantino))
Ray (Joe Adams (Harry Lennix))
Resident Evil: Extinction (Albert Wesker (Jason O'Mara))
Sphere (Dr. Harry Adams (Samuel L. Jackson))
Star Trek: Deep Space Nine (Kor (John Colicos))
The Suicide Squad (Savant (Michael Rooker))
Ted (Guy (Patrick Warburton))
Ted 2 (Guy (Patrick Warburton))
The Thirteenth Floor (Detective Larry McBain (Dennis Haysbert))
The Three Musketeers (Porthos (Ray Stevenson))
Transformers: Dark of the Moon (Dino (Francesco Quinn))
Turbulence (Stubbs (Brendan Gleeson))
Vinyl (Richie Finestra (Bobby Cannavale))
War (John Crawford (Jason Statham))

Animation

Cars (Mack)
Cars 2 (Mack)
Cars 3 (Mack)
Coco (Juan Ortodoncia)
Finding Dory (Bill)
The Good Dinosaur (Earl)
Kung Fu Panda 2 (Master Thundering Rhino)
Minions: The Rise of Gru (Stronghold)
Monsters University (Abominable Snowman)
Onward (Fenwick)
Planes (Harland)
Planes: Fire & Rescue (Brodie)
Puss in Boots (Raoul)
Smallfoot (Stonekeeper)
Storks (Jasper)
Tarzan II (Kago)
Transformers: Adventure (Megatronus)
Trolls World Tour (Smidge)
WALL-E (John)
What If...? (Nick Fury, Yondu)

Commercials
Sushiro

Interviews
Fumihiko Tachiki and Daisuke Sato Interview - 11/28/2006
Fumihiko Tachiki and Daisuke Sato Interview - 11/29/2006
Fumihiko Tachiki and Daisuke Sato Interview - 11/30/2006
Fumihiko Tachiki and Daisuke Sato Interview - 12/01/2006

References

External links
 Office Osawa profile
 
 
 

1961 births
20th-century Japanese male actors
21st-century Japanese male actors
Japanese male video game actors
Japanese male voice actors
Living people
People from Nagasaki
Seiyu Award winners